Pocholo Arellano Bugas (born 3 December 2001) is a Filipino professional footballer who plays for Philippines Football League club ADT and the Philippines national team.

Personal life
He is the brother of Filipino international footballer Paolo Bugas.

Club career

United City
In August 2020, Bugas signed his first professional contract with United City. He made his professional debut in a 6-0 win against Mendiola coming in as a substitute, replacing Hikaru Minegishi in the 73rd minute.

International career

Philippines U18
In August 2019, Bugas was called up to the Philippines U18 for the 2019 AFF U-18 Youth Championship in Vietnam. He scored his first goal for the U18 team in a 5-2 defeat against Timor-Leste U18. He scored his second goal against Brunei U18.

Philippines U23
Bugas was called up to represent the Philippines U23 in the 2019 Southeast Asian Games held in the Philippines. He made his debut for the U23 team in a 2–1 defeat against Myanmar U23, coming in as a substitute, replacing Edison Suerti in the 43rd minute.

In February 2022, Bugas was once again, called up to the Philippines U23 for the 2022 AFF U-23 Youth Championship held in Cambodia.

Philippines
In December 2022, he made his debut for the Philippines in a friendly against Vietnam, ending in a loss.

Career statistics

Club

Notes

Honours 
United City

 Copa Paulino Alcantara: 2022

References

2001 births
Living people
Far Eastern University alumni
Filipino footballers
Association football midfielders
Ceres–Negros F.C. players